Stadttor is a 20-storey  high-rise building in the Unterbilk neighborhood of Düsseldorf, Germany. The building was designed by Düsseldorf-based architecture firm Petzinka Pink und Partner and completed in 1998. It marks the Southern entrance of Rheinufertunnel, which is also the reason for its parallelogram-shaped floor plan.

The building features a 15-story atrium and a double-facade, allowing natural ventilation even on higher elevation floors. From 1999 until 2017, the Stadttor was the seat of the state-chancellery of the Prime ministers of North Rhine-Westphalia.

See also 
 List of tallest buildings in Germany

References 

Office buildings completed in 1998
High-tech architecture
Skyscrapers in Düsseldorf
Skyscraper office buildings in Germany